Alex Julián Cosi (born 8 September 1998) is an Argentine professional footballer who plays as a defender for Nueva Chicago.

Career
Cosi started his senior career in the ranks of Nueva Chicago. Having been an unused substitute once, versus San Martín, in the 2016–17 campaign, he made his bow in professional football in 2017–18 during a 3–0 defeat away to Aldosivi on 25 September 2017 with Cosi receiving a straight red card on sixty minutes. He didn't appear competitively until the following March against Deportivo Riestra, though went on to feature a further six times that season in Primera B Nacional.

Career statistics
.

References

External links

1998 births
Living people
Place of birth missing (living people)
Argentine footballers
Association football defenders
Primera Nacional players
Nueva Chicago footballers